Thabit ibn Jabr, better known by his epithet Ta'abbata Sharran (lived late 6th century or early 7th century CE) was a pre-Islamic Arabic poet of the su'luk (vagabond) school. He lived in the Arabian Peninsula near the city of Ta'if, and was a member of the  tribe. He was known for engaging in tribal conflict with the Banu Hudhayl and Bajila tribes. He wrote poems about tribal warfare, the hardships of desert life, and ghouls. His work was prominent in the early poetic anthologies, being preserved in both the Mufaddaliyat (8th century) and the Hamasah (9th century). Details of his life are known only from pseudo-historical accounts in the poetic anthologies and the Kitab al-Aghani.

Name 
His proper name was Thabit ibn Jabr al-Fahmi. Al-Fahmi is a nisba indicating his membership in the Fahm tribe. Ta'abatta Sharran is a laqab, or nickname, which means "he who has put evil in his armpit."

There are a number of traditional accounts of how he acquired the name, related in the Kitab al-Aghani. In one, he saw a ram in the desert. He picked it up and carried it under his arm, but it urinated on him. It became heavier as he approached his camp, so he dropped it, and saw that in fact it was a ghul. His clan asked him what he had been carrying, and he replied "the ghul," which prompted them to give him his nickname. In another, during truffle season, his mother asked why he was not gathering truffles for the family. He went out with her bag and filled it with snakes, then returned to the tent carrying the bag under his arm. He threw the bag down in front of her and she opened it, finding the snakes, then fled the tent. When she told the story to the women of the tribe, they gave Thabit his nickname. Another story has it that his mother gave him the name because he habitually carried his sword under his arm when travelling with a raiding party. Modern scholars believe that these traditions "should not be taken at face value," and that the name was intended to signify the poet's unavoidable propensity for trouble.

Life

The dates of Ta'abbata Sharran's life are not known. Based on personal names which occur in poems attributed to him, he likely lived in the late 6th century or early 7th century CE.  He lived in the western Arabian regions of Tihama and the Hejaz, near the city of Ta'if.

His mother was Amima al-Fahmia, of the Banu al-Qayn. After the death of his father Jabr, his mother married one of his enemies, .  Ta'abbata Sharran himself married a woman of the Banu Kilab.

He lived as a su'luk (plural sa'alik), a term which can be translated as brigand, brigand-poet, or vagabond. The sa'alik were mostly individuals who had been forced out of their tribes and who lived on the fringes of society. Some of the sa'alik became renowned poets, writing poetry about the hardships of desert life and their feelings of isolation.  However, scholar Albert Arazi notes that due to a lack of contemporary documents about the sa'alik, knowledge of them is uncertain and "it is not at all easy to unravel the problem posed by the existence of this group."

Ta'abbata Sharran was one of the few su'luk poets who was not repudiated by his tribe. He lived as a brigand, accompanied by a band of men including Al-Shanfara, Amir ibn al-Akhnas, al-Musayyab ibn Kilab, Murra ibn Khulayf, Sa'd ibn al-Ashras, and 'Amr ibn Barrak. The band primarily raided the tribes of Bajila, Banu Hudhayl, Azd, and Khath'am, and evaded pursuit by hiding in the Sarawat Mountains. Narratives of his life are found in several literary sources beginning in the 8th century, and include stylized accounts of his exploits such as him pouring honey on a mountain in order to slide to safety after a raid.

The poet was eventually killed during a raid against the Banu Hudhayl, and his body was thrown into a cave called al-Rakhman.

Poetry
Ta'abbata Sharran's poetic diwan consists of 238 verses divided into 32 poems and fragments. Typical of the su'luk poets, his work expresses strident individuality and a rejection of tribal values.

Qasida Qafiyya
Ta'abbata Sharran's "Qasida Qafiyya" is the opening poem of the Mufaddaliyat, an important collection of early Arabic poetry. According to the Italian orientalist Francesco Gabrieli, the Qafiyya may not have been written as a single poem, but might instead be a collection of Ta'abbata Sharran's verses compiled by later editors.

The opening lines of the Qafiyya are as follows:

This poem follows the traditional structure of the qasida, which consists of three sections: a nostalgic prelude, a description of a camel journey, and then the message or motive of the poem.  However, the poet subverts this structure in order to express "the ideal of perpetual marginality". The poem also contains several lines devoted to fakhr (boasting) about the poet's fleetness of foot, starting with line 4: "I escape [from her] as I escaped from the Bajila, when I ran at top speed on the night of the sandy tract at al-Raht." The incident to which this line refers is explained in three different stories in the Kitab al-Aghani, which differ in their details but have to do with the poet being captured by the Bajila during a raid and using a ruse to escape. Ta'abbata Sharran, along with al-Shanfara and 'Amr ibn Barraq, was famous for being a fast runner.

Charles Lyall translated the poem into English in 1918.

Qasida Lamiyya
The "Qasida Lamiyya," transmitted in the 9th-century Hamasah of Abu Tammam, is considered to be another of the poet's major works. However, the authenticity of this poem is doubtful. Al-Tibrizi, a major commentator on the Hamasa, believed that the true author was the rāwī (reciter) , while the Andalusian anthologist Ibn Abd Rabbih attributed it to a nephew of Ta'abbata Sharran. Contemporary scholar Alan Jones concluded that it may be a mixture of authentic and inauthentic material. The poem is a rithā' (elegy) on the death of the poet's uncle, slain on a mountain path by the Banu Hudhyal. The poet describes his vengeance on the Banu Hudhayl, in what scholar Suzanne Stetkevych calls "the most famous Arabic poem of blood vengeance."

Johann Wolfgang von Goethe admired the poem greatly, and included a German translation of it in the "Notes and Queries" section of his 1819 work West–östlicher Divan. Goethe's translation was based on Latin translations by Georg Freytag and Johann David Michaelis. Other translations include those of Charles Lyall into English (1930), Suzanne Stetkevych into English (1986), and Pierre Larcher into French (2012).

Other work

One poem, labelled either "How I Met the Ghul" or the "Qit'a Nuniyya," relates the story of the poet's encounter with a ghul. He was travelling at night in the territory of the Banu Hudhayl, when a ghul stepped in his way. He fought the ghul and killed her, then spent the night on top of her. In the morning he carried her under his arm and showed her to his friends: "Two eyes set in a hideous head, like the head of a cat, split-tongued, legs like a deformed fetus, the back of a dog." The structure of the poem parodies Arabic love poems in which lovers meet at night in the desert. In another, titled "Sulayma Says to Her Neighbor Women", he meets a ghul and attempts to have sex with her, but she writhes and reveals her horrible face, which prompts him to cut her head off. Further examples of his work can be found in poems VIII and IX of the Hamasah.

Legacy
A famous elegy in the Hamasah may refer to Ta'abbata Sharran.  The author is unknown but is typically taken to be either Ta'abbata Sharran's mother or the mother of another su'luk, . The poem emphasizes the role of fate:

He was also mocked in a humorous hija''' (lampoon) poem written by Qays ibn 'Azarah of the Banu Hudhayl, involving an incident in which Qays was captured by the Fahm and bargained for his life with Ta'abbata Sharran and his wife. In the poem Qays referred to Ta'abbata Sharran by the nickname Sha'l (firebrand), and his wife by the kunya Umm Jundab (mother of Jundab):

He also appeared as a character in the Resalat Al-Ghufran, written by Al-Ma'arri around 1033. During an imagined tour of hell, a Sheikh who criticized al-Ma'arri encounters Ta'abbata Sharran along with al-Shanfara, and asks him if he really married a ghul. Ta'abbata Sharran replies only, "All men are liars."

When Oriental studies became popular in Europe in the 19th century, scholars such as Silvestre de Sacy and Caussin de Perceval introduced su'luk poetry to a Western audience.  They wrote first about al-Shanfara, whose Lamiyyat al-'Arab is the most famous su'luk poem.  Interest in al-Shanfara led naturally to his associate Ta'abbata Sharran, who became known and appreciated in Europe during the 19th century. In the 20th century, Arab critics began to display renewed interest in su'luk'' poetry, and the influential Syrian poet and critic Adunis praised the works of Ta'abbata Sharran and al-Shanfara as quintessential specimens of "the literature of rejection."

Editions

Notes

References

Bibliography

External links
 
Text of Poems (Arabic) at Poets Gate

6th-century Arabic poets
7th-century Arabic poets